The following is a list of episodes from the series Butterbean's Café.

Series overview

Episodes

Season 1 (2018–19)

Season 2 (2020)

Notes

References

Lists of American children's animated television series episodes
Lists of Nickelodeon television series episodes